The 1964 Football Championship of Ukrainian SSR (Class B) was the 34th season of association football competition of the Ukrainian SSR, which was part of the Ukrainian Class B. It was the fourteenth in the Soviet Class B and the second season of the Ukrainian Class B. 

The 1964 Football Championship of Ukrainian SSR (Class B) was won by FC Lokomotyv Vinnytsia.

Location map

Zone 1 (West)

Relegated teams
 none

Promoted teams
 FC Neman Grodno – (debut)

Relocated and renamed teams
 FC Spartak Mogilev last season competed for the Union republics Class B
 FC Spartak Brest last season competed for the Union republics Class B
 FC Dvina Vitebsk last season competed for the Union republics Class B
 FC Temp Kyiv, replaced FC Arsenal Kyiv

Final standings

Zone 2 (Center)

Relegated teams
 none

Promoted teams
 FC Chaika Balaklava – (debut)
 FC Dunayets Izmayil – (debut)

Relocated and renamed teams
 FC Nistrul Bender last season competed for the Union republics Class B
 FC Lucaferul Tiraspol last season competed for the Union republics Class B
 FC Stroitel Beltsy last season competed for the Union republics Class B

Final standings

Zone 3 (Southeast)

Relegated teams
 none

Promoted teams
 none

Relocated and renamed teams
 FC Komunarets Komunarsk last season competed as FC Metalurh Komunarsk

Final standings

Second stage 
This season play-off featured a mini League format. The two successive ranking teams from one group were put together in group with the other two teams from other two groups of equal rank. For example, the first two placed teams of each group played off between themselves for the final ranking. Teams from Belarus and Moldova did not participate at this stage.

Places 1–6

Places 7–12

Places 13–18

Places 19–24 
Results are not certain

Places 25–30

Places 31–36

Places 37–41

See also
 Soviet Second League

External links
 1964 season regulations.  Luhansk football portal
 1964 Soviet championships (all leagues) at helmsoccer.narod.ru

1964
3
Soviet
Soviet
class B
1964 in Moldovan football
1964 in Belarusian football
Football Championship of the Ukrainian SSR